Marighella is a 2019 Brazilian biographical political thriller film directed by Wagner Moura, based on the life of Carlos Marighella, a Brazilian politician, writer, and Marxist–Leninist guerrilla fighter accused of engaging in "terrorist acts" against the Brazilian military dictatorship. The film was adapted from the biography Marighella - O Guerrilheiro que Incendiou o Mundo (Marighella - The Guerrilla Who Lit the World on Fire), by Mário Magalhães. It is Moura's directorial debut.

Seu Jorge plays Carlos Marighella. The film also features Adriana Esteves, Bruno Gagliasso and Humberto Carrão.

Cast 

 Seu Jorge as Carlos Marighella
 Adriana Esteves as Clara
 Bruno Gagliasso as Lúcio
 Luiz Carlos Vasconcelos as Almir
 Humberto Carrão as Humberto
 Jorge Paz as Jorge
 Bella Camero as Bella
 Herson Capri as Jorge Salles
 Henrique Vieira as Frei Henrique
 Ana Paula Bouzas as Maria
 Adanilo as Danilo
 Ana Paula Bouzas as Ana
 Tuna Dwek as Ieda
 Guilherme Lopes as Crespo
 Rafael Lozano as Rafael
 Charles Paraventi as Bob
 Brian Townes as Wilson Chandler

Reception 
Marighella debuted at the 69th Berlin International Film Festival on February 14, 2019, but did not compete for the Golden Bear Award.

The film received generally positive reviews from critics. The film has also attracted social and political controversies. Stephen Dalton, writing for The Hollywood Reporter, observed that Moura presents Marighella as a martyr for liberal values even though the real Marighella was a self-proclaimed far-left Marxist. Marighella's ethnicity was also debated. He is portrayed as black in the film and played by a black actor. Many critics noted, however, that Marighella was actually mixed-race (his father was an Italian immigrant). Moura responded that "there's no way to discuss any social issue in Brazil without talking about racial issues. For me, Marighella had to be black."

The movie was subject to politicized ratings on IMDb, leading the website to note that "unusual voting activity [had been detected]...  An alternate weighting calculation has been applied." In 2022, IMDb offers an aggregate 6.6 (out of 10) ranking.  Conservative digital activists low-ranked the film, which was countered by progressive activists and artists aligned with Moura offering high scores; in 2022, 95% of the film's rankings are at the extreme of 1 or 10. This distribution suggests that the majority of evaluations were based on ideology rather than cinematic quality; IMDb removed the activists' "critiques."

References

External links
 

2019 biographical drama films
2019 films
2019 directorial debut films
Brazilian biographical drama films
Films about Brazilian military dictatorship